Konstantinos Dosios (1810–1871) was a Greek lawyer and politician in the newly established independent state of Greece and minister plenipotentiary to the church. His son Aristeidis Dosios, an economist, author and banker, became known for his attempted assassination of Queen Amalia.

References

Sources
http://www.christopherlong.co.uk/gen/mavrogordatogen/fg16/fg16_287.html

1810 births
1871 deaths
19th-century Greek lawyers
19th-century Greek politicians
People from Vlasti